Mun Byeong-uk (born 18 June 1970) is a South Korean handball player. He competed at the 1992 Summer Olympics and the 2000 Summer Olympics.

References

1970 births
Living people
South Korean male handball players
Olympic handball players of South Korea
Handball players at the 1992 Summer Olympics
Handball players at the 2000 Summer Olympics
Place of birth missing (living people)
Asian Games medalists in handball
Handball players at the 1990 Asian Games
Handball players at the 1994 Asian Games
Asian Games gold medalists for South Korea
Medalists at the 1990 Asian Games
Medalists at the 1994 Asian Games
20th-century South Korean people